Mediawan Thematics (formerly known as AB Groupe) is a French business group in the field of broadcasting.

History
It was founded in 1977 by Jean-Luc Azoulay and Claude Berda as a music production company, and in 1987 went into the world of television.

On October 11, 2018, AB Groupe was rebranded to Mediawan Thematics after the purchase by Mediawan in 2017.

Television

Former channels 

AB sold many channels, notably the free national channels TMC and NT1 taken over by TF1 when they were the main shareholder of AB Groupe.

References

External links
 Mediawan Thematics
 BIS

 
Television networks in France
French-language television networks